Joshua Howard Luellen (born February 2, 1989), professionally known as Southside (also known as Sizzle), is an American record producer, songwriter and rapper. He gained recognition in the hip hop industry for producing songs for prominent artists across the American hip hop sphere. In 2010, Southside and fellow 1017 label-mate Lex Luger, established their production and songwriting team 808 Mafia, where Southside currently is at the helm of the group. The basis of his stage name is the place where Luellen grew up, Southside, in Atlanta, Georgia.

Early life 
Southside grew up in the Southside region of Atlanta, Georgia. Growing up, he played Little League Baseball but gave up the sport after suffering a concussion when he was hit in the head with a ball. He started making beats when he was 14 years old, when he got his first computer from his uncle.

Career 
It was around his mid-teenage years that Southside decided to start taking music production as a serious career,He was later discovered by then unknown rapper Waka Flocka Flame when he was 17 and through Waka's network, Gucci Mane eventually signed him to his label 1017 Brick Squad Records. At Bricksquad Records, Luellen met Lex Luger, who was another producer for Waka Flocka, and the two started working together to lay the production groundwork for Waka Flocka's debut album.

Southside's first major release was the song "Fuck the Club Up," which appeared on Waka Flocka's debut album Flockaveli. In 2011, Southside co-produced the track "Illest Motherfucker Alive", from Kanye West and Jay-Z's album Watch the Throne. This helped to boost his career and bring him into the mainstream hip hop scene. He has since worked with artists such as Rick Ross, B.o.B, Wale, Meek Mill, Lil Scrappy, MGK among others.

Southside was the main producer of Gucci Mane and Waka Flocka's collaboration album Ferrari Boyz and on Flocka's sophomore album Triple F Life: Friends, Fans & Family.

In January 2013, Southside produced "Millions" – the lead single from Pusha T's mixtape Wrath of Caine. The music video for the song was released on February 10. The song sparked controversy when producer Rico Beats was asked to modify Southside's instrumental for the final version of the song. Southside wasn't notified of the changes, which led to the two producers exchanging threats over Twitter. In Wrath of Caine official track list, Kanye West is credited as co-producer, instead of Rico Beats. Also in 2013, Southside and TM88 produced the song "Tapout" by Birdman for his album Rich Gang: Flashy Lifestyle. The song peaked at number 44 on the Billboard Hot 100 and was certified Gold By The RIAA.

Throughout the early 2010s, Southside's productions have been featured on numerous mixtapes. Along with 808 Mafia's TM88, the single "Danny Glover" became a breakout in early 2014 for Gucci Mane's protégé Young Thug, produced by Southside. By late 2014, Southside's production continued to catapult into Atlanta's hip hop mainstream when Future's mixtape Monster went on to become one of the most well acclaimed rap releases during that year as Southside handled a quarter of the mixtape's entire production. The well received project has seen more than a million combined streams and downloads via the online mixtape site DatPiff. Monster  standout "Commas" was released as an official commercial single in March 2015 and spent 20 weeks on the Billboard Hot 100 chart, peaking at number 55, simultaneity earning an RIAA gold certification further cementing Southside's career boost.

In 2015, Southside continued to push his trap sound in the hip hop industry ubiquitously, especially on various songs produced by him and his 808 Mafia collective. Luellen was responsible for producing a significant portion of Future's album, DS2, as well as being responsible for producing nine of the ten tracks of Future's mixtape, 56 Nights, in which Southside made the entire project's worth of beats in only one night. In addition, Southside also contributed to the production of three tracks on the collaborative mixtape  What a Time to Be Alive  by Future and Drake.

Artistry 
Southside uses the digital audio workstation, FL Studio along with custom installed VST plugins to compose his beats. Luellen's distinct signature trap sound is gritty, grimy, and thunderous hip hop street sound which is similar to that of his collaborators, Lex Luger and his group 808 Mafia. Despite such similarities, Luellen's sound is distinctly known to be more gangster, bombastic, gritty, rambunctious, and menacing compared to that of his collaborators. Luellen is known for his dark, belligerent, and menacing hip hop sound coupled with hard hitting 808 kicks, crisp snare drums, fast hi-hats, frantic synthesizers, sinister lead instruments, and colorfully layered ominous orchestration of synthesized brass, hits, stringed, woodwind, and keyboard instruments. Like many other producers Southside uses a musical signature tag on many of the songs he has produced. His main tag is a pitched-up voice saying his name. He also uses his team tag, 808 Mafia and more recently, a sample of the Ironside (1967 TV series) theme song produced by Quincy Jones. Back in the beginning of his career, Southside claimed to complete a single beat in 15 to 30 minutes, but as of 2015, he claims to be able to make a single beat in less than 6 minutes and with no sound. He cites Lil Jon as his favorite producer and enjoys the production work made by Pharrell, Shawty Redd, and Drumma Boy. He is also influenced by the production works of Kanye West, Dr. Dre, Timbaland and Swizz Beatz.

Southside also credits modern technology and internet, particularly through the monetization of music through streaming sites such as SoundCloud, YouTube, Spotify, and Apple Music that help him make a living off of his passion for hip hop music and well as making his own production career possible. Inside the studio, Southside is known for his strong work ethic and strategic marketing acumen when producing beats for artists and getting the finalized track on the mixtape circuit or radio. Since 2013, Southside began to focus on his career as a producer from an entrepreneurial perspective, cultivating talent while learning the ins and outs of the legality in the music production business as well as negotiating deals and making the financial decisions on every track he is responsible for producing.

Discography

Collaborative albums

Mixtapes

Singles

As lead artist

As featured artist

References

External links 

 

1989 births
Living people
1017 Brick Squad artists
African-American male rappers
African-American record producers
American hip hop record producers
American rhythm and blues keyboardists
Businesspeople from Atlanta
GOOD Music artists
Musicians from Atlanta
Rappers from Atlanta
Rappers from Georgia (U.S. state)
Songwriters from Georgia (U.S. state)
Southern hip hop musicians
Trap musicians
Record producers from Georgia (U.S. state)
21st-century American rappers
21st-century American male musicians
21st-century African-American musicians
20th-century African-American people
FL Studio users
African-American male songwriters